Ramphomicron is a genus of hummingbird in the family Trochilidae.
It contains two species:
 Black-backed thornbill (Ramphomicron dorsale)
 Purple-backed thornbill (Ramphomicron microrhynchum)

References

 
Taxa named by Charles Lucien Bonaparte
Taxonomy articles created by Polbot